European Wax Center is a major chain of hair removal salons that offers waxing services as well as products in the skincare, body, and brow categories. Founded in Aventura, Florida in 2004 and based in Plano, TX, European Wax Center is run through franchising. The chain has 878 locations in the United States, including locations in Alabama, Arizona, Arkansas, California, Colorado, Connecticut, Delaware, District of Columbia, Florida, Georgia, Hawaii, Idaho, Illinois, Indiana, Kansas, Kentucky, Louisiana, Maine, Maryland, Massachusetts, Michigan, Minnesota, Mississippi, Missouri, Nevada, New Hampshire, New Jersey, New Mexico, New York, North Carolina, North Dakota, Ohio, Oklahoma, Oregon, Pennsylvania, Rhode Island, South Carolina, Tennessee, Texas, Utah, Virginia, Washington, West Virginia, and Wisconsin.

History
Siblings Joshua and David Coba, founded European Wax Center as single center in Aventura, Florida in 2004. In 2008, the siblings started franchising European Wax Center. David Coba acted as the Chief Executive Officer (CEO) for 14 years. In October of 2018, David P. Berg, joined EWC as CEO. David Berg previously worked as the CEO at Carlson Hospitality with additional experience at Bloomin’ Brands, General Nutrition Centers, and Best Buy. In 2019, the brand moved its headquarters from Aventura, FL to Plano, TX, bringing with them an increase in jobs in the hair removal industry.

Brand

Process 
Franchises use a four-step waxing process. The first step cleanses the skin of makeup and skin oil, the second step uses a pre-wax oil that allows the wax to stick to just the hair on body and not the skin, the third step is the application of the wax to remove hair, and the fourth step is an application of a final treatment for the skin.

References

External links

Companies based in Miami-Dade County, Florida
Franchises
2021 initial public offerings